The Moncton Coliseum is an event venue and former ice hockey arena in Moncton, New Brunswick, Canada.

History 
The adjoining Moncton Agrena complex constitutes the largest trade show facility in Atlantic Canada.

It was the former home to the QMJHL's Moncton Wildcats and the National Basketball League of Canada's Moncton Magic.

It was also the former home of the AHL's New Brunswick Hawks (Toronto Maple Leafs and Chicago Blackhawks farm team, 1978–82), Alpines (Edmonton Oilers, 1982–84), Moncton Golden Flames (Calgary Flames and Boston Bruins, 1984–87) & Moncton Hawks (Winnipeg Jets, 1987–94).

The arena has hosted several large events, including the 2006 Memorial Cup, the CIS University Cup in 2007 and 2008 and the 2009 Ford World Men's Curling Championship. NHL pre-season hockey games are routinely held at the facility every year. The New York Islanders pre-season hockey camp is at the facility.

The arena has hosted concerts by many famous artists, spanning many different genres.

City Council voted 8–3 to build the new Moncton Events Centre downtown. This arena, now known as the Avenir Centre, was completed in 2018 and the Wildcats and Magic moved in for the 2018–19 season.

See also 

 List of entertainment events in Greater Moncton
 Moncton Sport Facilities

References

External links
Moncton Coliseum
Moncton Votes To Borrow up to 95.4 million for Events Center

Moncton Golden Flames
Moncton Hawks
New Brunswick Hawks
Moncton Miracles
Quebec Major Junior Hockey League arenas
Sports venues in Moncton
Music venues in New Brunswick
1973 establishments in New Brunswick
Sports venues completed in 1973
Moncton Magic